Yaani King Mondschein (born August 10, 1981) is an American actress, best known for portraying Neely Lloyd in the crime drama series Saving Grace (2007–2010) and providing the voice and motion capture for Riley Abel in the action-adventure video game The Last of Us: Left Behind (2014).

Early life
King was born in the Brooklyn borough of New York City on August 10, 1981. Her mother, a retired NYPD officer, also performed in theater. She is of Guyanese and West Indian descent, and grew up in New York's Queens borough. She attended Fiorello H. LaGuardia High School at the Lincoln Center for the Performing Arts, and later studied acting at The Actors Centre in London.

Career
King began her acting career appearing in a number of off-Broadway productions, and had guest roles on television series including Law & Order and Sex and The City. She made her film debut in a small part in the 2003 erotic thriller In the Cut, before a supporting turn in the 2004 romantic comedy The Prince & Me. In 2007, she moved to Los Angeles and had guest starring roles on Criminal Minds, CSI: Crime Scene Investigation, and Ghost Whisperer.

From 2009 to 2010, King was a regular cast member on the TNT crime drama series Saving Grace as Neely Lloyd, a young drug addict. During this time, she also guest starred on Mad Men, Major Crimes, and NCIS.

King provided the voice and motion capture for Riley Abel in the 2014 action-adventure video game The Last of Us: Left Behind. Later that year, she played a plantation slave in the Civil War western film Deliverance Creek. In 2015, she was cast in a recurring role as Ada Eze on the ABC prime time television soap opera Blood & Oil, and had a role on The Magicians in 2016. She appeared in the 2020 horror comedy film Bad Hair.

In 2022, King was cast as one of leads in the Oprah Winfrey Network prime time soap opera, The Kings of Napa.

Personal life
Yaani married actor Adam Mondschein on July 25, 2012.

Filmography

Film

Television

Video games

References

External links
 
 

1981 births
American film actresses
Living people
American people of Guyanese descent
People from Brooklyn
Actresses from New York City
American television actresses
21st-century American actresses
Fiorello H. LaGuardia High School alumni
People from Queens, New York